James Leroy Mount Jr. (born September 17, 1973), known professionally as James Mount, is an American actor best known for his role as Agent Thoms on Homeland and Officer Andrew Dove on Gotham.

Personal life 
In April 2007, he married Tracy Mount.

Filmography

Film

Television

References

 http://www-usr.rider.edu/~magazine/archives/fall2005/story_files/stage_presence/index.htm
 http://imdb.filmbox.info/character/ch0560267/?ref_=nm_flmg_act_2
 http://imdb.filmbox.info/character/ch0562467/?ref_=fn_al_ch_1
 http://starrymag.com/gotham-mad-city-smile-like-you-mean-it/
 http://www.tvmaze.com/characters/375620/homeland-agent-thoms
 http://www.tvmaze.com/characters/365046/gotham-officer-andrew-dove
 http://www.slantmagazine.com/house/article/homeland-recap-season-6-episode-6-the-return

External links
 

1973 births
Living people
American male film actors
American male television actors
21st-century American male actors
People from Princeton, New Jersey